Rhizomys, also known as bamboo rat, is a genus of rodents in the family Spalacidae.  Rhizomys are all stocky burrowers with short, naked tails, and contains the following species:
 Hoary bamboo rat (R. pruinosus)
 Chinese bamboo rat (R. sinensis)
 Large bamboo rat (R. sumatrensis)

References

 
Rodent genera
Taxa named by John Edward Gray
Taxonomy articles created by Polbot